KNFL (740 AM, "740 The Fan") is a radio station broadcasting a sports format. The station serves the Fargo-Moorhead metropolitan area. The station is currently owned by Wausau, Wisconsin-based
Midwest Communications Inc. All the offices and studios are located at 1020 S. 25th Street in Fargo, while its 6-tower transmitter array is located northeast of Glyndon. It has the fifth biggest daytime AM signal in the country.

History
First known as KKAG, 740 AM signed on testing its signal on November 13, 2006 with open carriers and test tones. The station became fully licensed by the Federal Communications Commission (FCC) on May 28, 2007 originally owned by Jeffrey Dress of Kennewick, Washington, and had been on the air since with a classic country format.

Although the radio industry already had speculated so, KKAG was originally planned to be operated by the late Robert Ingstad, but the project was put on the back burner when Robert Ingstad's brother, James Ingstad, purchased the Clear Channel radio station group of Fargo in January 2007.

On Monday, June 11, 2007, it was announced that Radio Fargo-Moorhead, owned by James Ingstad, planned to buy KKAG from Jeffrey Dress, and that it would broadcast the Fan Radio Network. KVOX on 1280 AM (now KVXR), former home of The Fan, is now a Catholic radio station owned by Real Presence radio. The official sale to Ingstad was approved on August 3, 2007. KKAG began simulcasting KVOX on August 14, 2007. On September 14, 2007, KKAG changed its call letters to KVOX, and the former KVOX (1280 AM) switched to KVXR.

On March 29, 2017, the station changed its call sign to the current KNFL.

Former Logo

References

External links
740 The Fan
FAN Radio Network

Sports radio stations in the United States
NFL (AM)
Radio stations established in 2006
Midwest Communications radio stations
2006 establishments in North Dakota